Henrietta Ebert ( Dobler, born 15 January 1954) is a German rower, who won the gold medal at the 1976 Summer Olympics and was a member of the SC Dynamo Potsdam.

She competed under her married name from 1976.

She trained as a confectioner and later worked as a public servant in Köpenick.

References

External links
 

1954 births
Living people
Sportspeople from Brandenburg an der Havel
People from Bezirk Potsdam
East German female rowers
Olympic rowers of East Germany
Rowers at the 1976 Summer Olympics
Olympic gold medalists for East Germany
Olympic medalists in rowing
Medalists at the 1976 Summer Olympics
World Rowing Championships medalists for East Germany
Recipients of the Patriotic Order of Merit in silver
European Rowing Championships medalists